Kaley Christine Cuoco (born November 30, 1985) is an American actress. After a series of supporting film and television roles in the late 1990s, she landed her breakthrough role as Bridget Hennessy on the ABC sitcom 8 Simple Rules (2002–2005). Thereafter, Cuoco voiced Brandy Harrington on Brandy & Mr. Whiskers (2004–2006) and appeared as Billie Jenkins on the final season of the television series Charmed (2005–2006). She later starred as Penny on the CBS sitcom The Big Bang Theory (2007–2019), and received a Satellite Award, a Critics' Choice Award, and two People's Choice Awards for the role. Since 2020, Cuoco has starred in and served as executive producer for the HBO Max comedic thriller The Flight Attendant, which received widespread critical acclaim. For this performance, she has received nominations at the Primetime Emmy Awards, the Golden Globe Awards, the Screen Actors Guild Awards, and the Critics' Choice Awards.

Cuoco made her film debut in the thriller television film Quicksand: No Escape (1992). Her film work includes Virtuosity (1995), Toothless (1997), Can't Be Heaven (1999), Alley Cats Strike (2000), Growing Up Brady (2000), Crimes of Fashion (2004), The Hollow (2004), Lucky 13 (2005), To Be Fat like Me (2007), Cougar Club (2007), Killer Movie (2008), The Penthouse (2010), Hop (2011), Authors Anonymous (2014), and The Wedding Ringer (2015). She received a star on the Hollywood Walk of Fame in 2014 and in October 2017 founded Yes, Norman Productions.

Early life
Cuoco was born in Camarillo, California, the elder daughter of Layne Ann (née Wingate), a homemaker, and Gary Carmine Cuoco, a realtor. Her father is of Italian descent while her mother is of English and German ancestry. Her sister, Briana, is an actress and singer who competed on the fifth season of The Voice and has a recurring role on the HBO Max series The Flight Attendant and on Harley Quinn as Barbara Gordon/Batgirl. As a child, Cuoco was a ranked amateur (aspiring) tennis player, a sport she took up when she was three years old. She stopped playing at the age of 16 to pursue a career in acting.

Career

1995–2006: Early work and 8 Simple Rules
Cuoco made her first feature film appearance as the young Karin Carter in the 1995 action thriller Virtuosity. From 2000 to 2001, she appeared on the CBS sitcom Ladies Man and in 2000 she portrayed former The Brady Bunch star Maureen McCormick in the TV film Growing Up Brady as well as starring in the Disney Channel original film Alley Cats Strike. In September 2002, she began a starring role as Bridget Hennessy on the ABC sitcom 8 Simple Rules for Dating My Teenage Daughter (afterwards 8 Simple Rules). Bridget was the oldest child, despite Cuoco being six years younger than Amy Davidson, who played her younger sister.

In addition to the final season of 8 Simple Rules, Cuoco had starring roles on the NBC miniseries 10.5, the ABC Family original film Crimes of Fashion, the independent film Debating Robert Lee, and in the film The Hollow at the same time. She also voiced the character of Brandy Harrington, a 14-year-old anthropomorphic mixed-breed dog, on the Disney Channel animated series Brandy and Mr. Whiskers. She voiced the character of Kirstee Smith in Bratz from 2004 to 2005. In the eighth season of the TV series Charmed, she appeared as Billie Jenkins, a powerful young witch with the powers of telekinesis and projection. Executive producer Brad Kern stated that Cuoco's character was initially brought in as a possible spin-off.

2007–2016: The Big Bang Theory and other roles

In September 2007, Cuoco began starring in the CBS sitcom The Big Bang Theory, playing Penny, a Cheesecake Factory employee and aspiring actress who lives across the hall from physicists Dr. Leonard Hofstadter and Dr. Sheldon Cooper. Prior to the 2010–2011 season, she earned US$60,000 an episode for the series, the same as her co-stars. In 2010, the cast negotiated a raise for each actor to make US$200,000 per episode. As of August 2014, Cuoco and her co-stars from The Big Bang Theory Johnny Galecki and Jim Parsons each earned an estimated US$1 million per episode.

In late October 2012, Cuoco enlisted the help of her sister Briana to organize a flash mob on the set of the show, in which she and the cast and crew surprised the studio audience by suddenly lip syncing and dancing to Carly Rae Jepsen's song "Call Me Maybe". A video of the event was posted on YouTube and became a viral success. A clip from the performance was also played during Cuoco's January 8, 2013, appearance on the late-night talk show Conan.

Cuoco starred in the Lifetime film To Be Fat like Me, which premiered on January 8, 2007. She played a minor role in the Prison Break episodes "The Message" and "Chicago", as well as starring in the comedy horror spoof Killer Movie in 2008. She also appeared in the 2010 film The Penthouse. In 2011, she posed nude in Allure magazine's annual "Naked Truth" feature. That same year, she appeared in the films Hop and The Last Ride. She was also chosen to host the Teen Choice Awards in 2011, as well as the People's Choice Awards in 2012 and 2013. She is a regular on Priceline.com commercials as the daughter of William Shatner's character.

2017–present: Harley Quinn animated series and The Flight Attendant
In October 2017, Cuoco founded Yes, Norman Productions, a television production company which entered an exclusive multi-year first-look production deal with Warner Bros. Television. Cuoco's first project through Yes, Norman was an adaptation of the book The Flight Attendant, written by author Chris Bohjalian, which was developed into a comedy-drama series of the same name. Cuoco starred in the series as Cassie Bowden, and also served as executive producer. The Flight Attendant premiered on November 26, 2020, on WarnerMedia's streaming platform HBO Max to widespread critical acclaim, and was renewed for a second season on December 18, 2020.

In October 2018, it was announced that Cuoco would voice the title character of the DC Universe adult animation series Harley Quinn, and also serve as executive producer. The series premiered on November 29, 2019, to critical acclaim. In September 2020, it was announced that the series was renewed for a third season and would move to HBO Max.

In August 2019, it was announced that Cuoco would executive produce the upcoming CBS comedy Pretty, which is written and also executive produced by Lindsey Kraft and Santina Muha. In April 2020, Cuoco joined the cast of the upcoming action comedy film The Man from Toronto as the female lead alongside Kevin Hart and Woody Harrelson.

In March 2021, it was announced that Cuoco would play Doris Day in an upcoming limited series based on A. E. Hotchner's 1976 biography, Doris Day: Her Own Story. She will also serve as an executive producer of the series. Two months later, her production company expanded its Warner overall deal.

Personal life
While working on The Big Bang Theory, Cuoco privately dated co-star Johnny Galecki for roughly two years, until December 2009. She later told CBS Watch in September 2010 that they have remained on good terms since ending their relationship.

On September 13, 2010, Cuoco broke her leg in a horse-riding accident and missed the filming of two episodes of The Big Bang Theory.

In October 2011, she became engaged to addiction specialist Josh Resnik, but ended their engagement by March 2012. She became engaged to professional tennis player Ryan Sweeting in September 2013, after three months of dating. They married on December 31, 2013, in Santa Susana, California. On September 25, 2015, it was announced that she and Sweeting had decided to divorce. The divorce was finalized on May 9, 2016.

Cuoco began dating equestrian Karl Cook in late 2016. They became engaged on November 30, 2017, Cuoco's 32nd birthday, and were married on June 30, 2018. In September 2021, the couple announced their separation, stating "we have realized that our current paths have taken us in opposite directions". In June 2022, their divorce was finalized.

Cuoco confirmed her relationship with actor Tom Pelphrey in May 2022. Five months later, she announced on Instagram that they were expecting their first child together, a daughter.

Filmography

Film

Television

Awards and nominations

References

External links

 
 

1985 births
Living people
20th-century American actresses
21st-century American actresses
Actresses from California
American child actresses
American film actresses
American television actresses
American television producers
American voice actresses
Television producers from California
People from Camarillo, California